Stomatoporidae is a family of bryozoans belonging to the order Cyclostomatida.

Genera

Genera:
 Guzhoviella Viskova, 2014
 Jullienipora Reverter-Gil & Fernandez-Pulpeiro, 2005
 Metastomatopora Moyano, 1991
 Peristomatopora 
 Proboscinopora 
 Stomatopora 
 Stomatoporina 
 Stomatoporopsis 
 Stoporatoma 
 Tetrastomatopora 
 Voigtopora

References

Cyclostomatida
Bryozoan families